China Airlines (CAL) is the state-owned flag carrier of the Republic of China (Taiwan), and one of its two major airlines along with EVA Air. It is headquartered in Taoyuan International Airport and operates over 1,400 flights weekly (including 91 pure cargo flights) to 102 cities across Asia, Europe, North America, and Oceania. Carrying over 19 million passengers and 5700 tons of cargo in 2017, the carrier was the 33rd largest airline in the world in terms of revenue passenger kilometers (RPK) and 10th largest in terms of freight revenue ton kilometers (FRTK).

China Airlines is owned by Taiwan-based China Airlines Group and operates China Airlines Cargo, a member of SkyTeam Cargo, which operates a fleet of freighter aircraft and manages its parent airline's cargo-hold capacity. Its sister airlines include Mandarin Airlines, which operates flights to domestic and low-demand regional destinations, and Tigerair Taiwan, which is a low-cost carrier established by China Airlines and Singaporean airline group Tigerair Holdings but is now wholly owned by China Airlines Group. The company slogan is Journey with a caring smile.

History

Formation and early years (1959–1970)

With a fleet of two PBY Amphibians, China Airlines was established on 16 December 1959, with its shares completely held by the Republic of China government. During the 1960s, China Airlines was able to establish its first scheduled routes. In October 1962, a flight from Taipei to Hualien became the airline's first domestic service. Later, the airlines introduced international flights to South Vietnam, Hong Kong, and Japan. With the airlines' first two Boeing 707 aircraft, trans-Pacific flights to San Francisco via Tokyo were initiated on 2 February 1970. The expansion of the company's 707 fleet also permitted more services in Southeast Asia, Northeast Asia, and North America (via Japan and Hawaii).

International expansion (1970–1995) 
Following the standard utilization of the wide-body 747 on the highly profitable Trans-Pacific – USA routes, China Airlines introduced its first two 747-100s (ex-Delta Air Lines aircraft) in 1976 and immediately placed them on its Hong Kong-Taipei-Tokyo-Honolulu-Los Angeles route. Shortly thereafter, four brand new Boeing 747SPs (Special Performance) were introduced in 1977. Due to political pressure, Japan ended its diplomatic ties with Taiwan in 1972, and all flights between Taiwan and Japan were stopped. The 747SP aircraft made it possible for China Airlines to fly daily nonstop services from Taipei to its North American destinations without stopping over in Japan. It also allowed the airlines to introduce flights to Saudi Arabia and South Africa. In 1979, the airlines switched all operations from the smaller Taipei Songshan Airport to the newly built Chiang Kai-Shek International Airport (now Taoyuan International Airport). Following the introduction of 747-200s, the airlines introduced its first European destination, Amsterdam.

In 1978, Japan allowed China Airlines to return to Tokyo International Airport at Haneda after relocating all other airlines at the New Tokyo International Airport at Narita, leaving China Airlines as the sole international operator at Haneda, which at the time was an exclusive domestic facility, the premise being that air carriers from the PRC and Taiwan were prevented from crossing paths at any Japanese airports. Eva Air joined China Airlines later on, although both eventually moved to New Tokyo (now Narita International), with CAL moving on April 18, 2002.

The next 20 years saw sporadic but far-reaching growth for the company. Later, the airline inaugurated its own round-the-world flight: (Taipei-Anchorage-New York-Amsterdam-Dubai-Taipei).

On 8 February 1990, China Airlines received the first of its initial five Boeing 747-400s (B-161). 1993 saw the airline listed on the Taiwan Stock Exchange. The new 747-400s and an earlier order with Airbus for over a dozen A300B4 and A300-600Rs wide body regional jets allowed for addition destination growth. During the 1990s, China Airlines also bought the McDonnell Douglas MD-11 and had to compete with a new competitor, EVA Air. They also founded another airline to deal with the PRC-ROC dispute which borrowed aircraft from China Airlines itself. One of China Airlines's 747-400s (B-164) was also used by President Lee Tung-hui during his trip to the United States in June 1995.

Change of logo and livery (1995–2010)

As Republic of China (Taiwan)'s flag carrier, China Airlines has been affected by disputes over the political status of Republic of China (Taiwan), and under pressure from the Chinese Communist Party, was barred from flying into a number of countries maintaining diplomatic relations with the People's Republic of China ("Mainland China"). As a result, in the mid-1990s, China Airlines subsidiary Mandarin Airlines took over some of its Sydney and Vancouver international routes. Starting from October 7, 1995, partly as a way to avoid the international controversy, China Airlines unveiled its "plum blossom" logo, replacing the national flag, which had previously appeared on the tail fins (empennage), and the aircraft livery from the red-white-blue national colors on the fuselage of its aircraft. The plum blossom (Prunus mume) is Republic of China's National Flower.

Throughout the 1990s, the airline employed many ex-ROC Air Force pilots. Due to the company's poor safety record in the 1990s, China Airlines began to change its pilot recruitment practices and the company began to actively recruit civilian-trained pilots with proven track records. In addition, the company began recruiting university graduates as trainees in its own pilot training program. The company also modified its maintenance and operational procedures. These decisions were instrumental in the company's improved safety record, culminating in the company's recognition by the IATA Operational Safety Audit (IOSA).

During the 1990s and early 2000s, China Airlines placed orders for various airliners including the Airbus A330, Airbus A340, Boeing 737-800, as well as for additional 747-400s (both the passenger and freighter version).

Due to improving cross-strait relations, the first cross-strait charter flights between Taiwan and China were introduced in 2003, with China Airlines' flight 585, operated by a Boeing 747-400, being the first Taiwanese flight to legally land in China. (The aircraft took off from Taipei Chiang Kai-Shek (now Taoyuan) Airport, stopped over at Hong Kong Airport, and landed at Shanghai Pudong Airport.) In 2005, the first nonstop cross-strait charter flights were initiated, with China Airlines' flight 581 (Taoyuan Airport to Beijing Capital Airport) being the first flight of the program to depart from Taiwan. In 2008, the first regular weekend charter flights between Taiwan and China started operating, with daily charter flights introduced later in the year. In 2009, regularly scheduled cross-strait flights were finally introduced.

Joining SkyTeam and "NexGen" plan (2010–present)
China Airlines signed an agreement to begin the process of joining airline alliance SkyTeam on 14 September 2010 and officially became a full member on 28 September 2011. This was marked by an update to the logo of the airline and the typeface in which "China Airlines" is printed. The carrier was the first Taiwanese airline to join an airline alliance.

Since 2012, China Airlines has been participating in the Pacific Greenhouse Gases Measurement (PGGM) Project, led by the Environmental Protection Administration, Ministry of Science and Technology, and National Central University. As part of the collaboration, China Airlines installed "In-service Aircraft for a Global Observing System (IAGOS)" on three aircraft: B-18806 (Airbus A340-300) in June 2012, B-18317 (Airbus A330-300) in July 2016, and B-18316 (Airbus A330-300) in July 2017. B-18806 also wore "The Official Airline for Climate Monitoring" special livery. Between July 2012 and September 2017, the PGGM fleet collected greenhouse gases-data from a total of 4682 flights. In May 2017, B-18806 was retired. B-18316 and B-18317 are expected to continue collecting data until 2027.

In December 2013, China Airlines announced its new joint venture with Singaporean low-cost carrier Tigerair Holdings (now defunct and replaced by Budget Aviation Holdings) to establish Tigerair Taiwan. The new airline flew its inaugural flight to Singapore on 26 September 2014 and became the first, and currently only, Taiwanese low-cost carrier. Tigerair Holdings previously held 10 percent of the shares. As disputes unfolded surrounding the partnership, China Airlines Group re-negotiated with Tigerair Holdings and has now taken full ownership of Tigerair Taiwan.

In March 2014, China Airlines announced the "NexGen (Next Generation)" plan to complement its then-upcoming Boeing 777-300ER and Airbus A350-900XWB. Designed to refresh the brand image of the carrier, the plan included product innovations, new uniforms, and fleet replacements. Through cooperating with designers from the Greater China region, the carrier hoped to introduce unique product offerings that can showcase the beauty of the Orient and cultural creativity of Taiwan. The first phase of the plan has been completed. In addition to new cabin designs, also introduced were the renovated Dynasty Lounges at Taiwan Taoyuan International Airport and the debut of new William Chang-designed uniforms. The new fleet types allowed the retirement of older aircraft; the A340-300 fleet was fully retired in June 2017 while the 747-400 has been fully replaced on long-haul routes. With the First Class-equipped 747s flying regionally and new long-haul aircraft not featuring First Class, China Airlines terminated First Class services in 2016. First Class seats are now sold as Business Class.

Future phases of the NexGen plan include ordering new aircraft to replace older fleet types. In May 2019, the airline announced that it will be introducing the Airbus A321neo, including 14 leased, 11 purchased, and 5 options, along with 3 orders and 3 options for the Boeing 777F. The A321neo will replace the Boeing 737-800 while 777Fs will replace the Boeing 747-400F. Cabin design on the A321neo will continue the NexGen design ethos to provide passenger experience cohesive with that of the 777 and A350.

Focus has also been put on tapping the maintenance, repair and overhaul (MRO) market. In January 2015, China Airlines established Taiwan Aircraft Maintenance & Engineering Co. (TAMECO), an airline MRO company focusing on Boeing 737, 777, and Airbus A320, A330/A340, and A350XWB families fuselage maintenance. For the project, Airbus is providing a wide range of support, one of which is inviting China Airlines to join the Airbus MRO Alliance (AMA), alongside AAR Corp, Aeroman, Sabena technics, Etihad Airways Engineering, and GAMECO. Moreover, a joint-venture agreement has been signed with Tulsa-based Nordam, specializing in nacelle, thrust reversers, and composite materials, to establish the only Nordam repair center in Asia. The first TAMECO hangar, to be completed in March 2019, will be able to accommodate 2 777/A350 and 3 737/A320 at the same time.

Labor-management unrest has been a major issue at China Airlines over recent years. On 25 June 2016, the Taoyuan Flight Attendants Union, representing some 2,500 cabin crew, staged the first strike in Taiwanese aviation history. A total of 122 passenger flights were cancelled during the day-long strike. During the 2019 Lunar New Year season, over 600 pilots participated in a 7-day strike by the Taoyuan Union of Pilots. Over 200 flights were cancelled between 8 February and 14 February.

In July 2020, the Legislative Yuan of the Republic of China passed a resolution for the Ministry of Transportation and Communications to rename the airline and redesign its liveries due to frequent confusion with Air China.

Headquarters

China Airlines has its headquarters, CAL Park, on the grounds of Taiwan Taoyuan International Airport in Dayuan District (formerly Dayuan Township), Taoyuan City (formerly Taoyuan County). CAL Park, located at the airport entrance, forms a straight line with Terminal 1, Terminal 2, and the future Terminal 3.

Previously China Airlines had its headquarters and facilities on the east side of Taipei Songshan Airport, in the China Airlines Building on Nanjing E. Road, and at Taiwan Taoyuan International Airport. The functions were consolidated following the completion of CAL Park. The Taipei Branch Office of the airline remains at the China Airlines Building in downtown Taipei.

Branding

Livery and uniforms
Prior to introducing the current plum blossom livery in 1995, the livery of China Airlines featured the flag of Republic of China (Taiwan) on the tail due to commercial and political reasons. The common practice after the move to Taiwan in 1949 was for related enterprises to have the Taiwanese flag. In the 1990s the airline management stated to the South China Morning Post that the logo change to the flower was not because of politics. Han Cheung of the Taipei Times wrote that "the change was reportedly made so that the airline could keep flying to Hong Kong after the 1997 handover to China."

In 2011, the carrier made alterations to its logo as part of refreshing the brand image, unveiled during SkyTeam joining ceremony in 28 September. A new font was chosen for the company name and a new approach was taken for the appearance of the plum blossom trademark.

China Airlines has had many uniforms since its establishment in 1959. The current uniform was designed by Hong Kong-based costume designer William Chang and introduced in 2015 to celebrate the carrier entering a "NexGen" Next Generation Era.

Marketing slogans
China Airlines has used different slogans throughout its operational history. In 2006, the current slogan was introduced to complement the new uniforms and to celebrate its 47th anniversary. China Airlines' slogans have been as follows:
 We treasure every encounter (1987–1995)
 We blossom everyday (1995–2006)
 Journey with a caring smile (2006)

 “ Expect The Coming Greatness” (approximately 2016) a slogan featured on marketing material distributed at the San Francisco Orchid Society's Pacific Orchid Expedition of which China Airlines was a sponsor. The marketing material also referenced “China Airlines presents newly retrofitted Boeing 747-400.”

Name issues

The name China Airlines reflects Taiwan's official name, the Republic of China. This became an issue during the COVID-19 pandemic when foreign officials and the international press mistakenly identified a number of China Airlines flights repatriating Taiwanese citizens or bringing medical supplies to afflicted countries as related to the People's Republic of China rather than the Republic of China. In April 2020 Premier Su Tseng-chang voiced support for changing the name but said that it might come at the cost of the nation's aviation rights. The Premier announced the China Airlines would highlight Taiwan on the fuselage of planes delivering COVID-19 related medical supplies.

Special liveries 

The first China Airlines special livery, the "Taiwan Touch Your Heart" tourism-promotional livery, was introduced in 2003. The project was a collaboration between the carrier and the Tourism Bureau of Taiwan. However, the plane was painted back to the normal livery before it left the hangar. Currently, China Airlines has a total of 9 special livery aircraft in service.

Aircraft manufacturer co-branded liveries 
China Airlines has a history of partnering with aircraft manufacturers to introduce special liveries. The first co-branded livery aircraft was a Boeing 747-400, which was delivered in 2004 carrying the combined livery-design of Boeing and the airline; the aircraft was painted back to China Airlines corporate colors in 2012. The second co-branded livery was painted on a Boeing 777-300ER delivered in May 2016. The third co-branded livery aircraft, first with Airbus, was painted on an Airbus A350-900. The design interweaves the China Airlines brand colors with the Airbus carbon fiber pattern.

Planes currently carrying hybrid liveries:
 B-18007 (Boeing 777-300ER) – World's first co-branded Boeing 777
 B-18918 (Airbus A350-900) – First aircraft in the world to use an Airbus co-branded livery.

Plane once carrying a hybrid livery:
 B-18210 (Boeing 747-400) – Nicknamed 'Blue Whale'; first aircraft in the world to use Boeing's co-branded livery on the 747-400

"Flying Ambassador of Taiwan” series 
In 2016, China Airlines announced that the Airbus A350-900 fleet will have a naming theme that combines endemic birds and unique features of Taiwan. The first two A350s were named Mikado pheasant and Taiwan blue magpie by the airline. The names of the remaining 12 aircraft were selected by the Taiwanese public online from a total of 24 choices.

Planes currently part of the series:
 B-18901 (Airbus A350-900) – Named and decorated after Mikado pheasant
 B-18908 (Airbus A350-900) – Named and decorated after Taiwan blue magpie

Skyteam alliance livery 
China Airlines has two aircraft painted in the SkyTeam alliance livery:
 B-18311 (Airbus A330-300) – Previously wore the "Sweet" Fruit livery

Plane once part of the series:
 B-18206 (Boeing 747-400) – First Boeing 747 to wear the Skyteam livery
 B-18211 (Boeing 747-400)

Historical special liveries

50th Anniversary series 

In 2009, China Airlines decorated one plane of each of its plane types with the "50th Anniversary" logo. All planes of the series now wear the regular corporate livery or another special livery.

Planes once part of this series:
 B-18208 (Boeing 747-400)
 B-18312 (Airbus A330-300)
 B-18606 (Boeing 737-800)
 B-18725 (Boeing 747-400F)
 B-18806 (Airbus A340-300) – Later wore the "Official Airline for Climate Monitoring" livery until its retirement

Taiwanese culture and creativity series 
In 2013, China Airlines revealed plans to start a series of Taiwan-themed special livery aircraft. The carrier collaborated with Taiwanese artists, cultural workers, and the Tourism Bureau to design the special liveries.

Planes once part of this series:
 B-18203 (Boeing 747-400) – Love & Hug livery, in collaboration with illustrator Jimmy Liao
 B-18358 (Airbus A330-300) – "Masalu! Taiwan" livery, in collaboration with Paiwan artist Sakuliu Pavavaljung and the Council of Indigenous Peoples
 B-18361 (Airbus A330-300) – "Cloud Gate Dance Theater" livery, in collaboration with Cloud Gate Dance Theater

60th Anniversary series 
In 2019, China Airlines entered its sixtieth year of operations. As part of the celebrations, the airline announced plans to decorate one aircraft from each of its fleet type with special 60th Anniversary stickers. The logo consisted of the number "60" in China Airlines' corporate colors, blue and red. The design also resembled "GO" and the infinity symbol "∞". All planes of the series now wear the regular corporate livery.

Planes once part of this series:
 B-18917 (Airbus A350-900)
 B-18701 (Boeing 747-400F)
 B-18006 (Boeing 777-300ER)
 B-18317 (Airbus A330-300)
 B-18659 (Boeing 737-800) – Previously painted in "Taichung" livery
 B-18210 (Boeing 747-400) – Previously painted in Boeing co-branded livery

Other retired special liveries 
 B-18209 (Boeing 747-400) – "Taiwan Touch Your Heart" livery, in collaboration with the Tourism Bureau
 B-18305 (Airbus A330-300) – Butterfly Orchid livery, in collaboration with the Council of Agriculture
 B-18311 (Airbus A330-300) – "Sweet" Fruit livery, in collaboration with the Council of Agriculture; currently wearing Skyteam livery
 B-18355 (Airbus A330-300) – "Welcome to Taiwan" livery, in collaboration with the Tourism Bureau
 B-18610 (Boeing 737-800) – Lavender livery, commemorating launch of Sapporo flights
 B-18806 (Airbus A340-300) – "The Official Airline for Climate Monitoring" livery for the Pacific Greenhouse Gases Measurement (PGGM) Project; previously painted in "50th Anniversary" livery
 B-18659 (Boeing 737-800) – "Taichung" livery, in collaboration with Taichung World Flora Exposition; leased to its subsidiary Mandarin Airlines until 2019; currently wearing "60th Anniversary" livery
 B-18657 (Boeing 737-800) – "Buddy Bears" livery, in collaboration with Tourism Bureau, Kaohsiung City Government and Kumamoto Prefecture; featuring Taiwanese and Japanese cartoon bears OhBear (Taiwan), Hero (Kaohsiung) and Kumamon (Kumamoto) along with famous landmarks from Kaohsiung and Kumamoto.

Destinations 

China Airlines currently operates over 1,400 flights weekly (including pure cargo flights) to 118 airports in 115 cities on 4 continents (excluding codeshare; brackets indicate future destinations). Japan is the most important market of the carrier, with over 180 flights weekly from multiple points in Taiwan to 14 Japanese destinations.

China Airlines has its largest hub at Taoyuan International Airport, which is the largest airport in Taiwan and is located near the national capital of Taipei. China Airlines operate out of both Terminal 1 and 2 at the airport. Operations to Europe, India, Korea, Hong Kong, Southeast Asia are located at Terminal 1 while those to China, Japan, North America and Oceania are located at Terminal 2. Additionally, China Airlines and its domestic subsidiary Mandarin Airlines operate numerous flights out of Kaohsiung International Airport and Taipei Songshan Airport, the downtown airport of Taipei. International flights from Songshan Airport to three Northeast Asian downtown airports, namely Tokyo–Haneda, Seoul–Gimpo, and Shanghai–Hongqiao, have important significance to the carrier as the routes form a Northeast Asia Golden Flight Circle.

The expansion of China Airlines international presence has long been limited by the political status of Taiwan. Flights to Mainland China were not permitted until 2003, when the carrier's Chinese New Year charter flight 585 from Taipei-Taoyuan to Shanghai–Pudong via Hong Kong made China Airlines the first Taiwanese carrier to legally land in Chinese mainland and the first carrier to legally fly between the two areas after their split during the civil war. The carrier operated occasional cross-strait charter flights for another few years until 2008, when regular charters flights started. In 2009, a new air service agreement allowed China Airlines to start regularly scheduled flights to the Mainland. Since then, China has quickly become the second-largest market for China Airlines, with over 130 flights to 33 destinations across the Mainland.

In September 2022, China Airline announced the resumption of flights to Bali, the popular Indonesian tourist destination as the travel industry starts recovering from the COVID-19 impact.

Route plans 

Over the period between 2011 and 2015, China Airlines focused on strengthening its regional network; starting 2015 until 2020, the carrier is strengthening and expanding its European, North American, and Oceanian network with the new long-haul fleet. After upgrading all its European routes to nonstop services, in late 2017, the carrier launched four weekly services to London Gatwick Airport.  However, due to COVID-19 pandemic, flights to London were routed to Heathrow Airport.  Although it was planned to move back to Gatwick in March 2021, but China Airlines opted to remain serving Heathrow as their scheduled London operation. In France, as China Airlines does not have rights to operate flights to Paris, the airline cooperated with SkyTeam-partner Air France to launch nonstop flights to the French capital on Air France's airplanes in April 2018. China Airlines sells 40% of the seats on the flight. In America, daily flights were launched between Taipei and Ontario International Airport in Greater Los Angeles in March 2018. Additionally, the carrier has expressed interests in launching European destinations such as Barcelona, Madrid, Milan, and Prague; in North America, Atlanta, Boston, Chicago, Seattle, Montréal, and Toronto.

Regarding its regional network, China Airlines is actively supporting the "New Southward Policy" of the Taiwanese government by adding frequencies to Southeast Asia. On the other hand, Mainland routes are being downsized due to tense cross-strait relations.

Codeshare agreements 
China Airlines codeshares with the following airlines:

 Air Europa
 Air France
 Bangkok Airways
 British Airways
 China Eastern Airlines
 China Southern Airlines
 Czech Airlines
 Delta Air Lines
 Garuda Indonesia
 Hawaiian Airlines
 Japan Airlines
 KLM
 Korean Air
 Malaysia Airlines
 Philippine Airlines
 Qantas
 Royal Brunei Airlines
 Shanghai Airlines
 Vietnam Airlines
 WestJet
 XiamenAir

Deutsche Bahn (DB) is the only non-airline codeshare partner of China Airlines. The CI code is placed on seven Frankfurt-initiating DB routes, including those to Cologne, Düsseldorf, Hamburg, Hanover, Munich, Nuremberg, and Stuttgart.
Additionally, China Airlines is planning on codesharing with British Airways. Initial agreements have been struck to cooperate from Taipei-Taoyuan to London-Heathrow and beyond.

Fleet

Current fleet 
, China Airlines operates the following aircraft:

Retired fleet

Gallery

Renewal plans

In May 2019, China Airlines announced that it will be introducing the Airbus A321neo to replace its Boeing 737-800 fleet. The airline will take delivery of 25 A321neos, including 14 leased and 11 purchased, starting 2021. The order with Airbus also includes the option for 5 more of the type.

China Airlines also has options for 6 A350s. Decision to switch the options to firm orders will be based upon the performance of the aircraft on European nonstop routes. The airline has taken a cautious attitude towards ordering the larger A350-1000 variant due to the large capacity.

Regarding the Airbus A330-300, replacement plans have been underway since 2017. Previously in 2016, a retrofit program was announced to upgrade the in-flight products on the A330. The plan was suspended indefinitely in favor of ordering and leasing new aircraft. On August 30, 2022, the airline announced its decision to order Boeing 787-9 for A330-300 replacement; either Boeing 777-9 or Airbus A350-1000 to replace 777-300ER is still under consideration. On September 29, 2022, China Airlines made a purchase order for 16 Boeing 787-9 wide-body aircraft.

Retirement plans
In June 2017, China Airlines completed the retirement of its entire Airbus A340-300 fleet and all Boeing 747-400 delivered before 2004. It has also phased out most Boeing 737-800 delivered before 2014. The retired A340-300 and Boeing 747-400 are either stored at the aircraft boneyard at Victorville Airport or sold. All stored passenger aircraft are to be sold eventually. The last of the newer Boeing 747-400 passenger fleet with the General Electric CF6 engines was retired in March 2021.

Cargo fleet plans

China Airlines Cargo, the freight division of China Airlines, currently operates a fleet of 21 freighters to 33 destinations across Asia, Europe and North America. The division also utilizes the cargo space on passenger aircraft of the group. In May 2019, China Airlines signed a Memorandum of Understanding (MoU) with Boeing for 3 orders and 3 options of the Boeing 777F. The 3 options were later changed to firm order. The 777F will partially replace the 747-400F fleet. In January 2022 an order for 4 more 777F aircraft was placed. In August 2022, the airlines said that Airbus A350F and Boeing 777-8F are both candidates for its next-gen freighters replacing the rest of the 747-400F fleet.

Services

Cabin classes

Business Class 
Business Class, formerly known as Dynasty Class, is offered on all China Airlines aircraft.

Premium Business Class 

Premium Business Class is available on the Boeing 777-300ERs and Airbus A350-900. The seats are configured in a 1-2-1 layout, offering every passenger direct aisle access. Each seat features natural woodgrain table, adjustable reading lights, multiple storage bins, AC and USB sockets and an 18-inch multiple-touch screen with touchscreen-control. Turndown service is offered by cabin crew upon request while a self-service galley bar, named as Sky Lounge, offers snacks, instant noodles, drinks, and books for passengers during in-flight.

Former First Class seats 

China Airlines has terminated First Class services since 1 July 2015. However, it still offers the hardware product on the Boeing 747 aircraft and markets the seats as Business Class ones. There are 12 flat-bed First Class seats located in each of the three-class Boeing 747s nose sections. Each seat features a 15.1-inch personal screen with Audio and Video On Demand (AVOD), USB port, universal power outlet, and noise cancelling headphone. Turndown service is offered by cabin crew upon request.

Recliner and angle-flat seats 
On the long haul Airbus A330-300s, there are 30 shell seats with 63" of pitch and 166° of recline; on the medium-haul A330s, there are 36 shell seats with 52" of pitch and 140° of recline. All Business Class seats on the Airbus fleet have in-seat power and personal television screens.

Boeing 747 aircraft equipped with First Class flatbed-seats have 49 Business Class recliner seats. All seats offer  of pitch, in-seat power, 10.4-inch IFE displays and have 140° of recline.

Premium Economy Class 

Premium Economy Class is offered on the Boeing 777-300ER and Airbus A350-900XWB. The class features fixed-back seats, 12.1-inch multiple-touch screens, USB ports, universal power outlets, footrests, leg-rests, and tables with adjustable tablet holders. Passengers travelling in Premium Economy Class will receive complimentary amenity kits, slippers, and inflatable neck-rests.

Economy Class 
Economy Class on all aircraft features  of pitch and, except on Boeing 737 aircraft, IFE screens ranging from 6.5 to 11.1-inch size.

China Airlines previously sold the Family Couch product on long haul flights operated by the Boeing 777-300ER and the Airbus A350-900XWB. It was a set of three Economy class seats, in the first 10 rows on the right of the Economy Class cabin on the 777 and first 6 rows on both right and left of the Economy Class cabin on the A350, that could be easily converted into a large surface area. By booking three adjacent Family Couch seats on long-haul flights, passengers could lie flat on their backs. However, due to low popularity, China Airlines has stopped selling the product as of June 2018. Seats capable of becoming Family Couch seats will now have leg-rests locked.

In-flight services

Meal services 

Food and beverages served on flights from Taipei are provided by China Pacific Catering Services (CPCS) facilities in Taipei. China Airlines offers a variety of meals on intercontinental routes, depending on seat class, destination and flight length. Western and Eastern menu selections are typically offered, including seasonal menu selections varied by destination. Special meal offerings can be requested in each class during booking, including children's, religious, vegetarian, and other meals. Meals from famous Taiwanese restaurants or hotels are offered, mostly to First and Business Class passengers.

China Airlines also offers refreshments (also known as light meals) or snack boxes on all of their international flights. Mixed nuts are offered to customers in all classes before flight while pre-flight drinks are served exclusively to First and Business Class passengers.

Self-Service Galley Bar 

The Boeing 777-300ER and Airbus A350-900 of China Airlines features a galley bar, Sky Lounge, for Premium Business Class passengers to serve themselves with coffee, tea, alcoholic beverages, cup noodles, or snacks. The bar area also features social areas, located next to the exits, and books selected by Eslite Bookstore.

In-flight entertainment 

Fantasy Sky, the in-flight entertainment system of China Airlines, is available on all aircraft types excluding the Boeing 737-800. The system comes in three languages: Traditional Chinese, English and Japanese. Over 100 movies are offered in addition to television shows, songs, and video games. Other functions include exterior camera views, company information, and connecting flight data (available prior to landing). Furthermore, on the Boeing 777-300ER, "Fantasy Sky" features Duty-Free catalogues, E-Books, surveys and chatrooms.

Regarding personal electronic devices, China Airlines, in accordance with governmental regulations, allows passengers to use electronics, storable in the seat pocket and under flight mode, throughout the journey. Digital devices heavier than  can only be used above . Furthermore, after landing and during long delays, data roaming will be allowed under the captain's permission.

In-flight connectivity (Wi-Fi)
In-flight Wi-Fi, utilizing the Panasonic Avionics eXConnect Ku band systems and Deutsche Telekom portals, is available on the Boeing 777-300ER and Airbus A350-900 once the plane reaches cruising altitude. Passengers can enjoy internet connection by paying through the system. There are also free services such as news articles and weather information. Phone calls and video chat are not permitted on the system.

In-flight magazines 

China Airlines publishes three in-flight magazines for its passengers: DYNASTY, Fantasy Sky, and Sky Boutique.

DYNASTY, the China Airlines magazine, has articles in English, Chinese, and Japanese. The articles feature local and international events, descriptive culture, social introductions, personal interviews, in-flight entertainment instructions, and China Airlines news.

Fantasy Sky, China Airlines' in-flight entertainment guide, provides information on the movies, videos, music, and radio channels offered.

Sky Boutique is China Airlines' duty-free catalog.

Dynasty Flyer 
Dynasty Flyer is China Airlines' frequent flyer program. There are four tiers where three elite tiers are Gold, Emerald, and Paragon. Members can qualify for these elite tiers by earning enough air miles and/or segments within 12 calendar months. Elite members have more privileges such as access to the VIP Lounge, a higher checked baggage allowance, and being able to upgrade their ticket to a different cabin.

Greater China Connection 
In January 2013, SkyTeam-members China Airlines, China Eastern Airlines, China Southern Airlines, and XiamenAir announced plans to establish Greater China Connection. The partnership ensures that members flying the four airlines can enjoy matched benefits and freely change flights to any Greater China Connection partner-flights.

Dynasty Lounges 

China Airlines' airline lounges are branded as "Dynasty Lounge". There are a total of 9 China Airlines lounges (including 1 Mandarin Airlines lounge in Taichung) at 7 different airports. Lounge services at other China Airlines destinations are offered by SkyTeam, partner airlines, or local operators. Dynasty Lounge is available to Business Class passengers and Dynasty Flyer Gold, Emerald, and Paragon cardholders. Two-section lounges include an Exclusive Area, for Dynasty Flyer Emerald and Paragon cardholders, and a Business Class Area, for Business Class passengers and Dynasty Flyer Gold cardholders.

Dynasty Lounge features vary by location. Services typically include meals, refreshments, free Wi-Fi access, computers, televisions, publications, shower facilities, and breast-feeding rooms. Sleeping quarters and tea bars are featured at the newly renovated Taiwan Taoyuan International Airport Terminal 1 lounge, which was designed by Taiwanese architect Ray Chen.

Location of Dynasty Lounges:
 Taipei Taoyuan International Terminal 1
 Taiwan Taoyuan International Airport Terminal 2 (near Gate D4; closed for renovation until Sep 2018)
 Taiwan Taoyuan International Airport Terminal 2 (previously branded as Dynasty Supreme Lounge)
 Kaohsiung International Airport
 Kuala Lumpur International Airport
 Bangkok Suvarnabhumi Airport
 Tokyo Narita International Airport Terminal 2
 Honolulu International Airport
 San Francisco International Airport

Skyteam Lounge Hong Kong 
At Hong Kong International Airport Terminal 1, China Airlines utilises the SkyTeam alliance lounge, in which the carrier, alliance partner China Eastern Airlines, and Plaza Premium Lounge lead the designing, management, and operations. The 1,038 square meters lounge is located near Gate 5 and provides a total of 230 seats.

Private bus services in the United States 
In the United States, China Airlines operates private bus services in selected cities to transport customers between their residing location and the airport.

In Greater New York, the airline operates a bus to John F. Kennedy International Airport from Fort Lee, Parsippany-Troy Hills, and Edison in northern New Jersey, and several points in Greater Philadelphia, including Cherry Hill, New Jersey, North Philadelphia, and South Philadelphia. In Los Angeles, a bus transports customers between Los Angeles International Airport, Monterey Park and Rowland Heights.

Previously, the airline operated buses for travelers in San Francisco, Houston and Abu Dhabi. The San Francisco buses transported customers to/from Milpitas and Cupertino. The Houston bus service served Sugar Land and Southwest Houston Chinatown.

Subsidiaries and associates 

China Airlines has diversified into related industries and sectors, including ground handling, aviation engineering, and inflight catering.

In 2022 China Airlines opened a major MRO facility at Taoyuan International Airport in a joint venture with Nordam.

Companies with a major China Airlines Group stake include:

Incidents and accidents 
Between 1994 and 2002, China Airlines suffered four fatal accidents, three of which each resulted in more than 200 deaths. The accidents contributed to the perception of the airline having a poor reputation for safety. Since then, the airline's safety record has seen an improvement. In 2007, in an article published after the explosion of Flight 120, The Wall Street Journal quoted analysts as saying the airline has had "a marked improvement in safety and operational performance since 2002", with the mid-air disintegration of Flight 611 being "a catalyst for an overhaul" in its safety practices.

1969
The aircraft was operating a domestic scheduled passenger flight from Taitung Airport to Kaohsiung International Airport. All 24 passengers and crew were killed.

1970s
12 August 1970: Flight 206, operated by a NAMC YS-11A (B-156), struck a ridge in thick fog while on approach to Taipei, killing 14 of 31 on board.
20 November 1971: Flight 825, operated by a Sud Aviation Caravelle III (B-1852), blew up after a bomb on board exploded, causing the deaths of 25 people over the Penghu Islands.
26 March 1975: Douglas C-47A (B-1553) crashed at Kompong Som following a mid-air collision with a Cessna L-19 Bird Dog.
9 March 1978: China Airlines Flight 831 , operated by a Boeing 737 (B-1870) was hijacked at Hong Kong, the aircraft landed safely at Kai Tak Airport where the hijacker was killed, the aircraft was also involved in China Airlines Flight 2265.
11 September 1979: Boeing 707-320C (B-1834), crashed shortly after take-off from Chiang Kai-shek International Airport during a training flight, killing all six crew on board.

1980s
7 February 1980: China Airlines Flight 009 had a tailstrike incident while landing in Chiang Kai Shek Airport
27 February 1980: China Airlines Flight 811, operated by a Boeing 707-309C (B-1826), crashed short of the runway at Manila International Airport, killing two of 135 on board. The same route with the same flight number will be the scene of an assassination of a Filipino politician three years later.

 
 21 August 1983: China Airlines Flight 811, operated by a Boeing 767-200 (B-1836) from Taipei, landed in Manila International Airport. A passenger on board the flight, Philippine opposition senator Benigno Aquino Jr., was returning from a self-imposed exile in the United States, only to be assassinated after being escorted from the aircraft. Coincidentally, this is the second China Airlines incident involving the flight number 811.
19 February 1985: Flight 006, operated by a Boeing 747SP (N4522V), performed an uncontrolled descent over the Pacific Ocean, resulting in substantial damage to the aircraft.
During landing, a nose-wheel tire blew. The crew performed a go-around during which the aircraft crashed; the wreckage was located on March 10 in 190 feet of water.
3 May 1986: Flight 334, operated by a Boeing 747-200F (B-198), was hijacked by its pilot, who landed the aircraft in Guangzhou, where he defected. The ROC government sent a delegation to discuss with their mainland counterpart regarding the return of the aircraft and two remaining crew.
26 October 1989: Flight 204, operated by a Boeing 737-200 (B-180), struck a mountain near Hualien, Taiwan after the crew used the climb out procedure for a different runway, causing the aircraft to make a wrong turn. All 54 passengers and crew aboard were killed.

1990s

29 December 1991: Flight 358, operated by a Boeing 747-200F (B-198, the same aircraft that was involved in the Flight 334 hijacking), hit a hillside near Wanli, Taiwan after separation of its No.3 & 4 engines, killing all five crew on board. 
7 December 1992: Flight 012, operated by a McDonnell Douglas MD-11 (B-150, which then crash as Flight 642), suffered altitude loss due to turbulence at 33,000 feet near the town of Kushimoto, Japan. The aircraft recovered from the fall and continued to Anchorage, landing there uneventfully despite the loss of its control elevators, which had been ripped off during the incident.
4 November 1993: Flight 605, operated by a recently delivered Boeing 747-400 (B-165), overran Kai Tak Airport runway 13 while landing during a typhoon. It had touched down more than 2/3 down the runway and was unable to stop before the end of the runway, finishing up in Hong Kong harbour. All 396 people on board were safely evacuated but the aircraft was written off. The vertical stabilizer was explosively removed to prevent interference with Kai Tak's Instrument Landing System (ILS).
26 April 1994: Flight 140, operated by an Airbus A300 (B-1816), crashed while landing at Nagoya, Japan due to crew error, killing 264 of 271 on board.
16 February 1998: Flight 676, operated by an Airbus A300 (B-1814), crashed after a failed missed approach at Chiang Kai-shek International Airport in Taiwan, killing all 196 aboard and 7 more on the ground, including ROC Central Bank Chief Hsu Yuan-Dong.
22 August 1999: Flight 642, operated by a McDonnell Douglas MD-11 (B-150), flipped over while landing at Hong Kong Airport during a typhoon. Three people were killed.

2000s
25 May 2002: Flight 611, operated by a Boeing 747-200B (B-18255), broke up in mid-air on the way to Chek Lap Kok International Airport in Hong Kong from Chiang Kai-shek International Airport in Taiwan. All 206 passengers and 19 crew members died. The aircraft was the last B747-200 in China Airlines' passenger fleet. The cause was improper repair after a 1980 tail-strike incident in Hong Kong's Kai Tak Airport.
20 August 2007: Flight 120, operated by a Boeing 737-800 (B-18616) inbound from Taipei, caught fire shortly after landing at Naha Airport in Okinawa Prefecture, Japan. After stopping on the runway, the engine started smoking and burning, later exploding and causing the aircraft to catch fire. All passengers and crew were evacuated without serious injury; a ground engineer knocked over by the blast was unhurt. The cause of the fire was attributed to a fuel tank puncture from a loose right wing slat bolt.

2020s
28 January 2022: Flight 5240, operated by a Boeing 747-400F (B-18715), sustained damage to its number 2 engine after skidding on the snow-covered ground and colliding with ground equipment at O'Hare International Airport.

See also

 List of airlines of Taiwan
 List of companies of Taiwan
 List of airports in Taiwan
 Transportation in Taiwan
 Air transport in Taiwan

References

External links

 China Airlines
 China Airlines Cargo Service
 China Airlines Fleet Age
 China Airlines Fleet Detail 
 Ho, Jessie. "China Airlines takes air safety to new levels." Taipei Times. Monday 24 December 2004.

 
China Airlines Group
Airlines of Taiwan
Association of Asia Pacific Airlines
Government-owned airlines
Taiwanese brands
Companies listed on the Taiwan Stock Exchange
Companies based in Taipei
Companies based in Taoyuan City
Airlines established in 1959
SkyTeam
1959 establishments in Taiwan